Talavera, officially the Municipality of Talavera,  is a 1st class municipality in the province of Nueva Ecija, Philippines. According to the PSA Census of Housing and Population for 2020, it has a population of 132,388.

Talavera is part of Cabanatuan conurbation as adjacent urban center in the heart of Nueva Ecija. It is dubbed as the "Milk Capital" and "Food basket in Inland Luzon".

Talavera is one of the fastest growing municipalities in the province and proposals have been planned for cityhood. Given its robust economic growth, Talavera enjoys annual progress and wealth. In July 2019, Congresswoman Estrellita B. Suansing has filed House Bill No. 184, regarding the cityhood of Talavera. It was later filed in the Senate in February 2021. Both bills are currently pending.

According to the National Competitiveness Council in Cities/Municipalities Competitiveness Index, during the past years, Talavera maintained their rankings as one of the most competitive municipalities in the Philippines.

It is bordered by Cabanatuan, Llanera, Muñoz, Aliaga, General Mamerto Natividad, Santo Domingo and San Jose.

History
Present-day Talavera was formerly a barrio of Cabanatuan. It was called “Katugian” which means a place abundant in “Tugue,” an edible root crop.

The distance between Cabanatuan's town center and Katugian was critical during the early phase of its development although it was only . The parish-curate at that time recommended to the Spanish administrators a separate and independent administration of Katugian.

By a royal decree issued on November 12, 1852, the plan making Katugian a town was approved. There was no formal inauguration of the new town in accordance with the royal decree. However, the Augustinian parish-curate of Cabanatuan, Fr. Gregorio Crisostomo, appointed the first officials of the town by sending his co-adjutor, a certain Pedro Estanislao Pascual, to handle the religious phase of the administration of the new town during Sundays and Holidays only.

The first barrios that composed the new town were La Torre, Pulong Buli (now Santo Domingo), Concepcion and Valle. Based on the petition presented to the Alcalde Mayor (governor) of Nueva Ecija, forwarded to the governor general in Manila, the “Talavera of the Crown of the Princess” was approved on February 17, 1853, by the Governor General.

In 1954, Talavera lost some territory when the barrios of General Luna, Morcon, Mabini, Ricarte, Casili, and Picon, together with sitios Plaridel and Bosque were separated to form the town of Llanera along with some territory from Rizal and San Jose.

Cityhood

House Bill No. 194 was filed on July 1, 2019 by Nueva Ecija's 1st district Representative Estrellita Suansing for the conversion of the municipality of Talavera into a component city. The bill is currently pending with the committee on local government since July 23, 2019. Senator Imee Marcos introduced Senate Bill No. 2040 for the conversion of the municipality in the Senate, pending in the committee since February 8, 2021.

Geography
The municipality's terrain is relatively flat, with slope ranging from 0 to 3%. Due to the flat topography, the land is suited for agricultural, commercial or industrial development.

Barangays
Talavera is politically subdivided into 53 barangays.

NOTE: "E" notes that the barangays are truly exclaved within Muñoz.

The National Government has an ongoing move to transfer Barangays Matingkis (Talavera), Bakal 1, Bakal 2 and Bakal 3 to become part of Science City of Muñoz for the reason that the said barangays are geographically and strategically within the said city. This was favored by most of the residents of the said barangays but was opposed by the Municipal Government of Talavera.

Climate

Demographics

Religion

Majority of Talavera's populace is Roman Catholic, served by St. Isidore the Worker Parish Church (Paroquia de San Isidro Labrador) and chapels in other barangays. Other religious groups have churches and places of worship in the municipality.

Economy 

Talavera's economy focus on the agricultural sector. Palay, onions, and calamansi are their main crops. However, making it progress, economically developed and sprouting business establishment in their poblacion areas are currently addressed the town more productive and sustainable.

Many government projects beneficial to the municipality's citizens were constructed, including the Nueva Ecija University of Science and Technology – Talavera Academic Extension Campus, an extension campus of the said university; Talavera Eternal Park, the municipality's cemetery; a town library, and government-run drugstore.

Tourism
Tourist attractions in Talavera include:
 Town Plaza 
Tren ng Bayan
 Crystal Waves Hotel and Resort
 DVF Dairy Farm
 Isdaan Floating Restaurant

Festival

Gatas ng Kalabaw Festival 
Carabao's milk festival also known as Gatas ng Kalabaw festival is celebrated annually from May 12 to 15, including feast of the patron Saint Isidore. The festival aims to actively encourage, promote and enhance carabao's milk as a nutrition and livelihood industry. Highlights of the festival are street dancing, followed by float parade, parade of carabaos, carabao race, agri-trade fair, milk drinking contest and ice cream making competition among others.

Semana Santa sa Talavera 
During Holy Week, the members of the church (San Isidro Labrador Parish Church) commemorate Jesus' Paschal mystery. The church even has a community where each member owns a religious image called the Cofradia de la Sagrado Pasion del Nuestro Señor. Every Holy Wednesdays and Good Fridays, the members of the Cofradia places the images of their saints in carozzas or karo and exhibits it for the townspeople to witness thru a procession.

Transportation

Due to its central location, Talavera is one of the pivotal transport points in Central Luzon.

Talavera is accessible by all means of land transportation. Regular jeepney trips are from 5:00 am to 9:00 pm. Tricycles are available 24 hours a day. Several bus companies also use the Talavera route from Cagayan Valley and Aurora to Manila, Cabanatuan, San Jose City, Baguio and other destinations.

Healthcare

Talavera's populace is served by Talavera General Hospital, a national government-funded hospital formerly known as Dr. Paulino J. Garcia Memorial Hospital - Talavera Extension Program. Medical and dental clinics also serve the municipality.

Education
Talavera is served by both public and Department of Education-accredited private schools. The largest elementary school is Talavera Central School, also known as Central, which is situated at the town proper. The largest secondary educational institution is Talavera National High School, colloquially knows as TNHS.

University and colleges:
Nueva Ecija University of Science and Technology – Talavera Academic Extension Campus
La Fortuna College – Talavera Campus
REH Montessori College
St. Elizabeth Global College

Gallery

References

External links

 [ Philippine Standard Geographic Code]
Philippine Census Information
Local Governance Performance Management System

Municipalities of Nueva Ecija